Coal mining played an important part in the history of the Black Country area immediately west of Birmingham, England. It was the basis for the area's industrial development in the nineteenth century; without coal there was insufficient power. Commentators spoke of the Black Country as a great coalfield, and of the earth turned inside out by all the mining activity. However, the mines were not the large scale operations that we know of today. They were small rough and ready pits similar to the Racecourse Colliery at Black Country Living Museum. There were as many as five or six hundred small pits like this exploiting the seams of the South Staffordshire coalfield.

Development of a mine
A small pit like the Racecourse Colliery would usually start up in the following way: a few men would get together and rent the mineral rights from whoever owned them; in this area that was usually the Earl of Dudley. This gave them the right to mine a few acres of land for whatever minerals lay under the ground, rather like an underground small-holding. These would be working men, probably miners themselves, who had saved the money from their wages to make this small investment. Alternatively, the Earl of Dudley could mine the coal himself and appoint an agent or a manager to run his pit for him.

The first stage of opening the mine was to dig the shaft. Initially a small makeshift frame would be used to shift the spoil, but as the shaft grew deeper a proper head frame would be erected over it with a winch to raise and lower the bowk. This was eventually replaced by a cage.

A sinking winding engine would be established in a temporary corrugated iron engine house very similar to the one onsite at the Black Country Living Museum. The sinking winder, powered by a steam engine, was used to re-open a shaft at the Black Country Living Museum in the same way that 90 or 100 years ago they would have opened a new shaft. The miners digging out the shaft were lowered down in the bowk. The bowk then removed the spoil as it was dug out, and the circular shaft was lined with brickwork.

The spoil from the shaft was emptied into the tipping wagon which was then pushed along the spoil heap on the tracks to the end where it was tipped off, thus forming the characteristic 'finger' spoil heaps of most small Black country pits. The rocky waste and clay was known as 'tocky'. The machine also on the rails behind the spoil wagon is an early electrical coal cutter the arm extending from the front moved through an arc and cut a corresponding arc in the coal seam which then allowed the coal to drop down in big lumps. One the shaft was established the sinking engine would either be dismantled and sold on or kept to use in an emergency.

Useful Facts

 There were two basic wage rates one for thick coal and one for thin coal.
 The difference was normally 1/-. This extra shilling was a kind of danger money for the thick coal miners
 A daily wage for thick coal miners in 1842 was 2s 4d (2/4). and in 1845 it was 4s (4/-) 
 By 1873 a daily wage for thick coal was 5/6d
 By 1842, Pay for a boy running the gin horse was 2/6 per week
 Until the early 1870s a normal day's stint was 12 hours with a 60-minute  drink hour. If working six days this would equal a sixty-six-hour week.

References

Coal mining in the United Kingdom
Black Country
History of the West Midlands (county)
Economy of the West Midlands (county)
Geology of the West Midlands (county)